The Fur Farming (Prohibition) Act 2000 (c. 33) is an Act of the Parliament of the United Kingdom to "prohibit the keeping of animals solely or primarily for slaughter for the value of their fur" in England and Wales. It received Royal Assent on 23 November 2000.

A public consultation in 1998 found that there was "overwhelming public support to end the practice." Prior to the ban, there were 11 fur farms in the UK, producing up to 100,000 mink skins each year.

The act only extends to England and Wales. Fur farming was later prohibited in Scotland by the Fur Farming (Prohibition) (Scotland) Act 2002. The last fur farm in Scotland closed in 1993, but rural development minister Ross Finnie nevertheless said the Scottish act was "very necessary", adding that "It would be somewhat perverse to have one part of the UK paying compensation to ban fur farming only to allow it to relocate and start up a fresh business in another part of the UK."

Fur farming was also banned in Northern Ireland in 2002 under the Fur Farming (Prohibition) (Northern Ireland) Order 2002.

References

External links

United Kingdom Acts of Parliament 2000
Animal welfare and rights legislation in the United Kingdom
Acts of the Parliament of the United Kingdom concerning England and Wales
Fur
Agriculture in England
Agriculture in Wales